Lisa Rinehart is an American dancer, writer, and video journalist covering the arts, culture, and social issues. She has choreographed productions for the Hudson Valley Shakespeare Festival, New York City's Lincoln Center for the Performing Arts and other stages. Rinehart holds a master's degree in Cultural Communications from New York University and studied in the graduate journalism program at City University of New York. She is a former dancer with American Ballet Theatre.

Personal life
She is married to fellow ballet dancer Mikhail Baryshnikov, and has three children with him: Peter Andrew, Anna Katerina, and Sofia-Luisa.

References

External links
 Dance documentaries on Wendy Whelan, Liz Gerring, Young Arts
 Short film The Billion Dollar Spy
 Publications in Dance Magazine and Danceview Times 
 Rinehart (first from right) as the Silver Fairy in Act III of The Sleeping Beauty

American ballerinas
American Ballet Theatre dancers
Living people
Year of birth missing (living people)
Baryshnikov family